Abiha or Abeeha, is an Arabic feminine given name. Its meaning is "her father" which was given to Fatima az-Zahra  by the Islamic prophet Muhammad as "Umm Abiha".

Notable people with the name 
Abiha Haider (b. 1996), Pakistani footballer

References 

Arabic-language surnames
Arabic feminine given names
Bosniak feminine given names